The Seven is the collaborative EP by American hip hop recording artists Talib Kweli and Styles P. It was released on April 14, 2017, by Javotti Media and 3D. The EP features guest appearances from artists such as Common, Jadakiss, Sheek Louch and Rapsody, among others. The EP's production was handled by 88-Keys, Oh No, Nottz, Marco Polo, Khrysis and Amadeus.

Track listing

Notes
  signifies a co-producer
 "Nine Point Five" features scratches and additional arrangement by Shylow.
 "Last Ones" features additional vocals by Dyce Payne.

Charts

References

2017 EPs
Talib Kweli albums
Styles P albums
Collaborative albums
Albums produced by 88-Keys
Albums produced by Dot da Genius
Albums produced by Khrysis
Albums produced by Marco Polo
Albums produced by Nottz
Albums produced by Oh No (musician)